Lincoln Boulevard is a major northwest–southeast boulevard near Santa Monica Bay in Los Angeles County in California. Over  in length, it connects Los Angeles International Airport (LAX) with Santa Monica. A portion of Lincoln Boulevard is signed as part of California State Route 1 (Pacific Coast Highway), making it a major route to go along the Pacific Coast in Los Angeles.

Route
Lincoln Boulevard begins by branching northwest from Sepulveda Boulevard at the northern side of Los Angeles International Airport (LAX). It then passes through the Los Angeles districts of Westchester, Playa Vista, and Venice before entering Santa Monica. After crossing Wilshire Boulevard, it then changes from a four-lane thoroughfare to a residential street before terminating at San Vicente Boulevard.

Major landmarks include Loyola Marymount University, Otis College of Art and Design, and the Ballona Wetlands.

Lincoln is known for high levels of auto traffic during daylight and rush hours. This congestion creates other high levels of traffic on alternate parallel residential streets, such as Walgrove Avenue in Venice.

Signage
The portion between its southern terminus at Sepulveda Boulevard and the Santa Monica Freeway (Interstate 10) is signed as part of State Route 1. To the north, Route 1 continues as Pacific Coast Highway. To the south, Route 1 continues as Sepulveda Boulevard. The portion between Interstate 10 and the Santa Monica Boulevard was originally part of State Route 2.

Rapid transit
Santa Monica Transit line 3 and Rapid 3 operate on Lincoln Boulevard.

References 

Streets in Los Angeles
Streets in Santa Monica, California
Boulevards in the United States
California State Route 1
Marina del Rey, California
Venice, Los Angeles
Westchester, Los Angeles